Jerry R. Turner (born November 16, 1941) is an American Republican politician. Since 2004, he has served as a member of the Mississippi House of Representatives from the 18th District.

References

External links
 Jerry Turner at Vote Smart

1941 births
Living people
Republican Party members of the Mississippi House of Representatives
Politicians from Tupelo, Mississippi
21st-century American politicians